The Regulus Grammar Compiler is a software system for compiling unification grammars into grammars for speech recognition systems.

References

Notes
 M. Rayner, B. A. Hockey and P. Bouillon (2006). Putting Linguistics into Speech Recognition: The Regulus Grammar Compiler. Stanford University Center for the Study of language and information, Stanford, California. .

External links
 
 

Natural language processing software
Speech recognition software